Jale is a Town in Darbhanga district, it named after Jaleshwari sthan which is a pilgrimage site in rural area of Darbhanga.

Demographies
As of the 2001 India census, Jale block had a population of approx. 37256. Males constitute 19222 of the population and females 18034. Jalley has an average literacy rate of 54.90%, which is less than the Bihar average of 61.80%: male literacy is 63.33% and, female literacy is 45.87%. In Jalley, 19.53% of the population is under 6 years of age. Jale is a place where people of different languages and religions live. The source of Income is Business & Agriculture, which constitutes maximum towards the economy of Jale block. Post office, Block, Government Hospital, Government School & High School, College (up to graduation), Nurse Training centre, Police Station, State Bank of India, Indian Bank, ATM is also located in Jale.

Places to visit 

 Ahilya Asthan - It is famous historical temple, situated about 10 km. South of Kamtaul Railway Station in Jale Block. This place is known as Ahilya gram. There is a well known in the Ramayan about Ahalya. According to Ramayan when Lord Ram was his way to Janakpur his feet touched a stone and it turned into a woman who was non-else but Ahilya. Her husband Gautam Rishi cursed the Ahilya to transform into stone. The temple is dedicated to Ahalya, wife of Gautam Rishi. Large fairs are held every year on the occasion of Ramnavami in the Hindi month of Chaitra and Vivah Panchami in Agrahayan. There are various other temples and mosques in the village.
 Gautam kunda - situated about 8 km, According to the Puranic tradition Lord Brahma appeared before Gautam Rishi at this place after the chastity of his wife, Lord Indra and Chandrama had violated Ahalya. The village derives its name from this occurrence. In regard to the Gautam Kund, it is believed that God Brahma himself created the tank by piercing the earth with seven arrows, so that Gautam might not have to travel a long distance for bathing in the Ganga.

References

Cities and towns in Darbhanga district